Winternitz may refer to:
 German name of Vintířov, now an obec (district) of Radonice (Chomutov District)
 Winternitz (surname)